in  Japan, also known as the neo-defense school, is a term used by Asian media only recently to refer to a hawkish new generation of Japanese conservatives.  They are distinguished from older Japanese conservatives in that they take a more "active" view of the Japanese Self-Defense Forces and are known for making what would be considered in the West politically incorrect statements (Shintaro Ishihara is particularly well known for this). Despite this, or perhaps because of it, they enjoy fair popularity across the nation, especially with the middle-aged population. The term is used in China, North Korea, and South Korea, as well as in Japan, to describe them.

As members of the post-war generation, they view themselves as free of responsibility or guilt for Japan's conquests and wartime history and Japanese war crimes. They view China as a country that harbors historical grievances for political gain, rather than accepting Japan's apologies. They express strong patriotic pride and stress Japan's international role. They view the North and South Korean-Japanese relationship as no longer particularly special, but rather desire to rebuild it as a "normal relationship"—one in which Japanese war guilt is no longer a factor in bilateral negotiations. Accordingly, they also support changing the Japanese constitution, especially Article 9 which is viewed as obsolete, so as to make progress towards "normalizing" Japan's status (that is to enable the country to re-arm to the level of most other countries). 

The neoconservatives generally eschew traditional party-line factionalism, form alliances with lawmakers connected to defense, and create their own study committees. The bipartisan "Young Lawmaker's Group for Establishing Security in the New Century", founded in 2001, is the crux of the neoconservative group within the Japanese Diet. Note that the "Young" in the title is relative - being in their 40s and 50s, they are younger than the majority of powerful politicians who are in their 60s and 70s.

Neoconservatives 
The neoconservatives are a group of "younger" politicians, in their 40s and 50s. Notable neoconservatives often include:
Shinzo Abe, former Prime  Minister of Japan, the successor of Junichiro Koizumi, an anti-North Korea hardliner
Tōru Hashimoto, mayor of Osaka
Takashi Kawamura, Mayor of Nagoya
Shigeru Ishiba, Former Minister of State for Defense and major proponent of Japan's involvement in the US-initiated War in Iraq
Shintaro Ishihara, former governor of Tokyo, and co-author of the controversial essay, "The Japan That Can Say No"
Seiji Maehara, a hardliner and former Minister for Foreign Affairs
Shoichi Nakagawa, Chairman of the Policy Research Council of the Liberal Democratic Party (LDP)
Keizo Takemi, an LDP member and head of the "Young Lawmaker's Group"
Ichita Yamamoto, head of the LDP team studying sanctions on North Korea

Allies 
Junichiro Koizumi, a former prime minister preceding Shinzo Abe, is a conservative in the foreign policy arena, and receives support from the neoconservative legislators, but is not himself considered a neoconservative.

See also 
 Political extremism in Japan
 Uyoku dantai
 North Korean abductions of Japanese
 Japanese history textbook controversies
 Politics of Japan
 Sino-Japanese relations
 Japanese nationalism

References

Japan's 'Neocons' Feel No Debt to Korea from the Choson Ilbo
Korea-Japan Relationship Going Sour from Dong-a Ilbo
Geography, history flex E. Asia's 'quadrilateral' from the Japan Times
Standing Their Ground from TIME Asia
North Korea nuke threat gives ammunition to Japan hawks from Reuters, by George Nishiyama, April 27, 2002
"Communists soften their stance as Japan shifts to the right: The JCP's realisation that it needs to whittle away its harder ideological edges has arrived late in the day" from the Financial Times, by David Ibison, June 26, 2003
"Former ally returns as thorn in PM's side" from the Financial Times, by David Pilling, October 28, 2003
"US-Japan Alliance May Become Obstacle to Peace in East Asia" from Ta Kung Pao, by Ma Hao-liang, November 25, 2005
Without Asia's Trust, Japan Will Remain a Political Pygmy, from Choson Ilbo, Editorial, 30 March 2005
POLITICAL PULSE / LDP reinvents itself as neocon from the Daily Yomiuri Online, by Takashi Oda, September 3, 2005 —uses a slightly different definition of "neocon", alleging that:
"...the LDP has begun to shift from conventional conservatism, in which reallocation of benefits is dependent on adjustments within a community, to neoconservatism, which prioritizes independent individuals and the market mechanism, and seeks to create a small government through deregulation."
Conservatism in Japan
Japanese nationalism
Neoconservatism
Politics of Japan